(Laud to God in all his kingdoms), known as the Ascension Oratorio, is an oratorio by Johann Sebastian Bach, marked by him as  (Oratorio for the feast of the Ascension of Christ), probably composed in 1735 for the service for Ascension and first performed on 19 May 1735.

Bach had composed his Christmas Oratorio, based on the gospels of Luke and Matthew, in 1734. He had composed an Easter Oratorio already in 1725. The text for the Ascension Oratorio, a compilation of several biblical sources, free poetry and chorales, was presumably written by Picander who had worked on the libretto for the Christmas Oratorio. It follows the story of the Ascension as told in Luke, Mark and the Acts of the Apostles. The oratorio is structured in eleven movements in two parts, taking about half an hour to perform. It is framed by extended choral movements, Part I is concluded by the fourth stanza of Johann Rist's hymn "" in a four-part setting. The closing chorale on the seventh stanza of Gottfried Wilhelm Sacer's "" is set as a chorale fantasia. The work is richly scored for the feast day, exactly like the Christmas Oratorio for four vocal parts, three trumpets, timpani, two flauti traversi, two oboes, strings and continuo.

History 
Bach had composed his Christmas Oratorio, based on the gospels of Luke and Matthew, in 1734, a work in six parts to be performed on six occasions during Christmas tide. He had composed an Easter Oratorio already in 1725. The composition for Ascension appeared thus in the same liturgical year as the Christmas Oratorio. The text for the Ascension Oratorio, a compilation of several biblical sources, free poetry and chorales, was presumably written by Picander who had written the libretti for the St Matthew Passion and the Christmas Oratorio, among others. It follows the story of the Ascension as told in Luke, Mark and the Acts of the Apostles.

The bible narration is compiled from multiple sources: the first recitative of the Evangelist (movement 2) is from Luke 24, the second (5) from Acts 1 and Mark 16, the third (7) from Acts 1, the last (9) from Luke 24, Acts 1, and Luke 24. The biblical words are narrated by the tenor as the Evangelist. In his third recitative two men are quoted, for this quotation tenor and bass both sing in an Arioso.

Part I, which tells of the Ascension, is concluded by the fourth stanza of Johann Rist's hymn "" in a four-part setting. Part II reflects the reaction of the disciples. The closing chorale on the seventh stanza of Gottfried Wilhelm Sacer's "" is set as a chorale fantasia. While the music for the narration and the first chorale were new compositions in 1735, Bach based the framing choral movements and the two arias on earlier compositions.

Music

Scoring and structure 
The oratorio spans eleven movements in two parts to be performed before and after the sermon, 1–6 before the sermon and 7–11 after the sermon. It takes about half an hour to perform. The title on the first page of the autograph reads:  "J.J." is short for "Jesu juva" (Jesus, help), a formula which Bach and others often wrote at the beginning of a sacred piece. The title in Latin translates to "Oratorio for the feast of the Ascension of Christ", and the scoring in a mixture of French and Italian names the parts and instruments as four vocal parts, three trumpets (Tr), timpani, two flauti traversi (Ft), two oboes (Ob), two violins (Vn), viola (Va) and basso continuo (Bc) by Bach. The voices are soprano, alto, tenor and bass, forming a four-part choir (SATB). The work is festively scored, exactly like the Christmas Oratorio.

The structure shows symmetry around the central chorale. Expansive chorale movements using the complete orchestra frame the work. Both parts contain besides the bible narration (rec.) a reflective accompagnato recitative (acc.) and an aria with obbligato instruments. In the following table of the movements, the scoring is taken the Neue Bach-Ausgabe. The keys and time signatures are taken from Alfred Dürr, using the symbol for common time (4/4). The timpani always play with the trumpets and are not mentioned.

Movements 
The Bach scholar Richard D. P. Jones compares the Christmas Oratorio and the Ascension Oratorio and arrives at similarities:

The oratorio is similar especially to Part VI of the Christmas Oratorio which also begins with an extended opening chorus and a chorale fantasia as a conclusion.

1 
The festive opening chorus, "", is believed to be based on a movement from the lost secular cantata . The movement has no fugue, but dance-like elements and Lombard rhythm.

2 
Bach marks the first recitative of bible narration "Recit. nach dem ersten Chor" (Recitative after the first chorus). The action begins, "" (The Lord Jesus lifted up His hands), with Jesus blessing the disciples and leaving them.

3 

A reflecting recitative for bass, "" (Ah, Jesus, is Your departure), shows the situation of the disciples afraid that Jesus will leave them soon. Marked "Rec: col accomp."

4 
Deeper reflection is expressed in an aria, marked "Aria Violini unisoni e Alto" (Aria Violins in unison and Alto). The singer requests Jesus to stay: "" (Ah, just stay, my dearest Life). The music is based on a movement from the lost wedding cantata , BWV Anh. 196, written in 1725 on a libretto by Johann Christoph Gottsched.

5 
The Evangelist continues the narration with the Ascension: "" (And He was apparently lifted up).

6 

The first chorale, closing part 1, is the fourth stanza of "", written in 1641 by Johann Rist. The text "" (Now everything is subject to You) imagines Jesus in heaven, with the angels and elements serving him.

It is composed as a four-part setting, with the instruments playing : oboes and violin I enforce the chorale tune, the flutes an octave higher, violin II plays with the alto, viola with the tenor, and the continuo with the bass.

7 
The evangelist begins Part II, "" (And as they watched), telling of two men in white gowns addressing the disciples. The two men are represented by tenor and bass in a duet.

8 
A reflecting recitative for alto, "" (Ah yes! Then come back soon;), requests the return of Jesus. Parallel to the bass recitative in Part I, it is also accompanied by the flutes and continuo.

9 
The evangelist ends the narration, "" (They however prayed to Him), telling of the disciples' return from the mountain which is named the Mount of Olives.

10 
The soprano aria, "" (Jesus, Your merciful gaze), is also based on the wedding cantata . It is one of the rare pieces in Bach's music without basso continuo, with the two unison flutes, the oboe and the unison strings playing a trio, augmented to a quartet by the singer. The original words in the wedding cantata mentioned "" (innocence). Brian Robins notes "the lightly translucent texture reflecting the text's allusion to Christ leaving his body to ascend to Heaven". Jones thinks that the setting without an earthly continuo represents the Gnadenblicke (glances of Grace) of the text.

11 
The closing chorale, "" (When shall it happen"), is the seventh stanza of "", written in 1697 by Gottfried Wilhelm Sacer. Set in the first person, it expresses the desire of the speaker for the "liebe Zeit" (dear time) when he sees the Saviour in his glory. Continuing saying "wir" (we), he imagines to greet him and kiss him.

It is set as a chorale fantasia. Similar to the final chorale  of the Christmas Oratorio, the chorale tune in a church mode appears in the triumphant context of a different major key. The text expresses longing for the day of being united with Jesus in Heaven. The musicologist Julian Mincham interprets the mode of the tune as "the human state of waiting and hoping", while the concerto represents the fulfillment. Mincham compares the writing to the opening chorale fantasias of the second cantata cycle of chorale cantatas, finding the composition for the lower voices "endlessly inventive, frequently related to the textual images" pointing out "the passionate and clinging representation of kissing the Saviour beneath the caressing flutes, in the penultimate phrase".

Recordings 
The sortable listing is taken from the selection provided by Aryeh Oron on the Bach Cantatas Website. Ensembles with period instruments in historically informed performance and choirs of one voice per part (OVPP) is marked by green background.

Notes

References

External links 
 
 Lobet Gott in seinen Reichen (Ascension Oratorio) BWV 11; BC D 9 / Oratorio (Ascension Day) Bach Digital
 BWV 11.6 bach-chorales.com

Passions and oratorios by Johann Sebastian Bach
1735 compositions
Oratorios based on the Bible
Ascension of Jesus